The 2019 Stanley Cup Finals was the championship series of the National Hockey League's (NHL) 2018–19 season and the culmination of the 2019 Stanley Cup playoffs. The Western Conference champion St. Louis Blues defeated the Eastern Conference champion Boston Bruins four games to three in the best-of-seven series. It was the Blues' first championship, in their 51st season of play (not including the 2004–05 lockout), ending what was then the third-longest championship drought in league history. The Bruins had home-ice advantage in the series with the better regular season record. The series began on May 27 and concluded on June 12. The Blues' Stanley Cup–winning run of 26 playoff games tied the 2014 Los Angeles Kings for the longest of any Stanley Cup–winning team in history.

This was a rematch of the 1970 Stanley Cup Finals, which Boston won in four, the fourth consecutive Finals to both involve at least one team vying for its first championship and end with the champion clinching the Cup on the road, and the first time since 2011 when the Finals went the full seven games.

Entering the 2019 finals, the Blues were the oldest franchise to have not won a Stanley Cup and the only active team from the 1967 NHL expansion without a Stanley Cup. The Blues' victory resulted in all five of the active 1967 teams having a Stanley Cup title, while the Buffalo Sabres and Vancouver Canucks became the oldest franchises to not win one.

Paths to the Finals

Boston Bruins 

This was the Boston Bruins' twentieth appearance in the Stanley Cup Finals, six years after , when they faced the Chicago Blackhawks and were defeated in six games. The Bruins last won the Stanley Cup in  against the Vancouver Canucks in seven games, their sixth Cup in franchise history.

Brad Marchand became the first Bruin since the 2005–06 season to score 100 points, finishing the regular season with 100 points in 79 games. David Pastrnak led the team in goals with 38. Tuukka Rask and Jaroslav Halak split the goaltending duties during the regular season. Halak had signed with the team during the off-season, and approaching the trade deadline the Bruins acquired forwards Charlie Coyle and Marcus Johansson.

Boston finished the regular season with 107 points, finishing in second place in the Atlantic Division and third overall in the league. In the First Round of the playoffs, they defeated the Toronto Maple Leafs in seven games for the second consecutive playoff meeting against the Maple Leafs and third since the 2012–13 season. They then defeated the Columbus Blue Jackets 4–2 in the Second Round. In the Conference Finals, Boston swept the Carolina Hurricanes.

St. Louis Blues 

This was the St. Louis Blues' fourth appearance in the Stanley Cup Finals. Their last appearance in the Finals was in  against the Bruins, which Boston won in a four-game sweep. All of St. Louis' prior appearances came during their first three seasons after the Blues and five other new teams formed the West Division in the 1967 NHL expansion. While the Blues were able to advance past their fellow expansion franchises, each Finals appearance ended with them being swept by Original Six teams that comprised the East Division, concluding with their 1970 defeat. In the years that followed, the other expansion teams from 1967 would win Stanley Cup titles (excluding the defunct California Golden Seals franchise), but the Blues went nearly half a century without reaching the Finals again and became the oldest franchise not to win the Stanley Cup.

Ryan O'Reilly, who was acquired via trade in the off-season led the team in scoring with 77 points and assists with 49. Vladimir Tarasenko led the team in goal-scoring with 33 goals.

St. Louis struggled early in the regular season, beginning the year with a 7–9–3 record. Head coach Mike Yeo was fired and assistant coach Craig Berube named interim coach. Their record declined to an NHL-worst 15–18–4 with 34 points on January 2, 2019. However, the Blues went on a 30–10–5 run to finish the season with 99 points, third in the Central Division. Amid their turnaround, rookie goaltender Jordan Binnington was given his first start and went on to obtain 23 wins. In the playoffs, St. Louis defeated the Winnipeg Jets 4–2 in the First Round, eliminated the Dallas Stars in seven games, and won 4–2 against the San Jose Sharks in the Conference Finals.

Game summaries 
Note: Number in parenthesis represents the player's total goals or assists to that point of the entire four rounds of the playoffs

Game one 

In game one, Brayden Schenn scored the first goal of the Finals for the Blues, firing a wrist shot past Tuukka Rask. In the second period, Bruins forward David Pastrnak mistakenly passed back to an open Schenn who gave the puck to Vladimir Tarasenko who doubled the lead for St. Louis. The Bruins quickly scored after, as a pass by Sean Kuraly deflected off of intended target Connor Clifton's skate and then goalie Jordan Binnington's stick and into the net. Charlie McAvoy then tied the game on the power play speeding through the Blues zone to put one past Binnington. In the third period, Boston gained the lead as a net-mouth scramble ended up on Sean Kuraly's stick who fired it past Binnington. The Bruins continued their shot output, placing ten more on Binnington before being pulled. Brad Marchand sealed the Bruins victory after a successful defensive zone face-off put the puck into the Blues' zone and the forward shot it into the empty net.

Game two 

In game two, Boston scored the first goal when Samuel Blais was given a penalty for goaltender interference and Charlie Coyle put the puck past St. Louis goaltender Jordan Binnington. The Blues struck back when Robert Bortuzzo's shot deflected off of Matt Grzelcyk and squeaked past Tuukka Rask on the short side. The Bruins scored 40 seconds later to take the lead again with Joakim Nordstrom moving around the St. Louis defenceman and backhanding his shot past Binnington. Vladimir Tarasenko then tied the game for the Blues when his shot rebounded off of Rask and backhanded his shot into the open net. In the second period, the Blues dominated in shots fourteen to six but neither team scored. However, Blues forward Tyler Bozak was high-sticked resulting in an injury to the forward; St. Louis was granted a 4-minute power-play. The teams were even in shots in the third period, but with no scoring, the game went into overtime. During the overtime period, Bruins defenceman Brandon Carlo tripped up Alexander Steen and on the delayed penalty, Carl Gunnarsson fired a slap shot past Rask giving St. Louis their first victory in the Finals in franchise history and tying the series 1–1.

Game three 

In game three, Boston took over the first period with three unanswered goals. The first came from Patrice Bergeron on the power-play. The next came from Charlie Coyle whose wrist shot got past Blues goaltender Jordan Binnington. The last goal came from Sean Kuraly with less than ten seconds in the period; the goal was unsuccessfully challenged on an offside review. With power-play given to the Bruins from the failed offside challenge, David Pastrnak capitalized in the second period, backhanding his shot past Binnington. The Blues were able to get on the board as Zach Sanford passed to an open Ivan Barbashev for his third goal of the playoffs. However, the Bruins quickly had their four-goal restored when Colton Parayko was sent to the penalty box for high-sticking and Torey Krug cashed in for Boston's third power-play goal of the game. Binnington was pulled from the game following this goal and replaced with Jake Allen. In the third period, a roughing penalty by Bruins captain Zdeno Chara proved costly as Parayko scored on the given power-play, his slap shot deflecting off of Brandon Carlo. Although the Blues out shot the Bruins eleven to four, beyond the one goal, St. Louis could not get another past Tuukka Rask. Bruins forward Noel Acciari scored an empty-net goal to add insurance. Boston added another power-play goal with Marcus Johansson's slap shot cleanly beating Allen finalizing the score at 7–2. The Bruins scored on every power-play that they had in the game, scoring on each of their four power-play shots.

Game four 

In game four, Ryan O'Reilly scored first for the Blues, scoring a wrap-around goal 43 seconds into the game. The Bruins counter-attacked when Zdeno Chara shot at Jordan Binnington and the rebound went to Charlie Coyle who slid it past the Blues goaltender. The Blues regained the lead when Alex Pietrangelo's shot rebounded to Vladimir Tarasenko firing a wrist shot past Tuukka Rask. In the second period, with Boston forward Connor Clifton resigned to the penalty box for an illegal check to the head, the Bruins, shorthanded, tied the game as Brandon Carlo picked up a rebound to shoot it past Binnington. Midway through the third period, however, the Blues regained the lead with a rebound going to O'Reilly. The Blues staved off the Bruins, limiting Boston's shots to five. Brayden Schenn sealed the game's final score at 4–2 with an empty-net goal tying the series at 2–2.

Game five 

In game five, the Bruins piled on seventeen shots in the first period, but Blues goaltender Jordan Binnington held down the fort. The Blues got the first goal of the game in the second period as Ryan O'Reilly backhanded a shot past Tuukka Rask. The Bruins continued the pressure into the third period. In the third period, controversy occurred when Blues forward Tyler Bozak tripped Noel Acciari, but no penalty was called on the play. With play continuing while Acciari was down on the ice, David Perron scored with the puck deflecting off Rask into the net. The Bruins got on the board with less than seven minutes remaining when Oskar Sundqvist high-sticked Torey Krug, causing a delayed penalty, and the Boston defenceman passed to an open Jake DeBrusk who fired it past Binnington. The Blues played defensively for the final minutes to win the game 2–1 and lead the series 3–2.

Game six 

In game six, after both Brayden Schenn and Ryan O'Reilly were sent to the penalty box for boarding and delay of game respectively, Boston forward Brad Marchand scored on the resulting 5-on-3 power play. In the second period, both teams were relatively even in shots, Boston with eight and St. Louis with ten, but neither team scored. In the third period, Bruins defenceman Brandon Carlo shot a bouncing puck towards Jordan Binnington which snuck under the Blues goaltender's blocker for the second goal of the game. Karson Kuhlman gave Boston a three-goal lead with his first goal of the playoffs. St. Louis got on the board when O'Reilly's shot appeared to cross the goal line after a video replay. The Bruins regained their three-goal lead when the Blues in a defensive scramble left David Pastnak alone in front of the net and he fired the puck past Binnington. The Blues pulled Binnington in an attempt to tie the game, but Zdeno Chara sealed the victory for the Bruins finalizing the score at 5–1 and sending the series to a seventh game.

Game seven 

In game seven, Jay Bouwmeester's shot got through a screen of players and Ryan O'Reilly tipped the puck past Tuukka Rask for the opening goal. The Blues increased their lead with eight seconds remaining in the first period when Jaden Schwartz passed to an open Alex Pietrangelo who backhanded his shot for his third goal of the playoffs. Boston continued to pressure St. Louis in the second period with eleven shots, but Jordan Binnington kept the score at 2–0. In the third period, Vladimir Tarasenko followed the puck into the Bruins' zone and passed to an open Brayden Schenn who fired the puck past Rask. Zach Sanford made the score 4–0 as the Blues continued to work in the offensive zone, with David Perron working around the Bruins defenceman to pass to the open rookie forward. The Bruins then swapped Rask for an extra attacker and thwarted Binnington's shutout attempt with a goal from Matt Grzelcyk. With the 4–1 victory, the Blues became the last remaining expansion franchise from 1967 to win the Stanley Cup. O'Reilly was awarded the Conn Smythe Trophy as the most valuable player in the playoffs.

Team rosters 
Years indicated in boldface under the "Finals appearance" column signify that the player won the Stanley Cup in the given year.

Boston Bruins

St. Louis Blues

Stanley Cup engraving

The Stanley Cup was presented to Blues captain Alex Pietrangelo by NHL commissioner Gary Bettman following the Blues 4–1 win over the Bruins in game seven.

The following Blues players and staff qualified to have their names engraved on the Stanley Cup:

2018–19 St. Louis Blues

Players included
 #4 Carl Gunnarsson(D) - played 25 regular-season games & 19 playoff games(7 games finals), qualifying. He missed 57 regular-season games, and 2 playoff games injured.
 #15 Robby Fabbri(C/W) - played 32 regular-season games & 10 playoff games(2 games finals), qualifying. He missed 22 regular-season games injured

Player notes
These players were on the extended roster during the playoffs, having played regular-season games for St. Louis.
 Mackenzie MacEachern – 29 regular-season games
 Jordan Schmaltz – 20 regular-season games
 Jordan Kyrou – 16 regular-season games
 Jordan Nolan – 14 regular-season games
 Chris Butler – 13 regular-season games
 Michael Del Zotto – 7 regular-season games for St. Louis (along with 23 for Vancouver and 12 for Anaheim)
 Chris Thorburn – 1 regular-season game

None of these players played in the playoffs for St. Louis. However, Del Zotto qualified to be engraved on the Cup as he played at least 41 regular-season games (42 with 3 teams). All other names were left off the Cup.

Television and radio 
In Canada, the series was broadcast by Sportsnet and CBC Television in English, and TVA Sports in French. In the U.S., the Finals were split between NBC (Games 1, and 4 through 7) and NBCSN (Games 2 and 3).

In the United States, the seven-game series averaged 5.3 million viewers, the highest average since the six-game 2015 Stanley Cup Finals. St. Louis had an average 28.7 rating, and Boston had an average 25.5. Game 7 had an average 8.7 million viewers, being the most watched NHL game in nearly 50 years.

Notes

References

Further reading

External links 
 

 
2018–19 NHL season
Stanley Cup Finals
Stanley Cup Finals
Stanley Cup
St. Louis Blues games
Boston Bruins games
Ice hockey competitions in St. Louis
Ice hockey competitions in Boston
Stanley Cup
Stanley Cup